George Tanner (born 16 November 1999) is an English professional footballer who plays for Bristol City as a full-back.

Career

Manchester United
Initially a forward, Tanner made seven appearances for Manchester United's under-18 team in 2015–16, and joined the club as an academy scholar in July 2016. After joining the club, he found himself used more as a full-back, and made 27 appearances from left-back in 2016–17. He added another 20 appearances for the under-18s in 2017–18, as well as a further seven for the under-19s in the 2017–18 UEFA Youth League and one in the 2017–18 FA Youth Cup. He signed his first professional contract with the club on 30 January 2018. In 2018–19, he was promoted to the under-23 side, making his debut in a 2–2 draw at Fulham on 9 August 2018. He made 17 appearances in Premier League 2 that season, as well as another three in the 2018–19 UEFA Youth League.

In 2019–20, after being an unused substitute for Manchester United's under-23s in a 2–0 win over Rotherham United in the EFL Trophy on 6 August 2019, Tanner joined Morecambe for the remainder of the season. He made his debut for Morecambe in an EFL Cup first-round game against Mansfield Town on 13 August, receiving a booking as the match finished in a 2–2 draw, Morecambe progressing on penalties. He made his English Football League debut four days later, playing 63 minutes of a goalless draw with Cheltenham Town. After his loan at Morecambe was cut short early, Tanner joined another League Two club on loan, this time Salford City.

He was released by Manchester United at the end of the 2019–20 season.

Carlisle United
On 3 August 2020 he signed for Carlisle United. He scored his first goal for the club on 27 October 2020, in a 3–1 league victory against Morecambe.

Bristol City
He signed for Bristol City on 30 August 2021.

Career statistics

References

1999 births
Living people
English footballers
Manchester United F.C. players
Morecambe F.C. players
Salford City F.C. players
Carlisle United F.C. players
Bristol City F.C. players
English Football League players
Association football fullbacks